Lawrence Manchester is very in-demand music producer, engineer and mixer based in New York City. Whether collaborating on viral videos surpassing thirteen billion views, supervising Camila Cabello's broadcast sound for two landmark Grammy performances, recording a symphony orchestra for Martin Scorsese's OSCAR-winning masterpiece, The Departed, tracking vocals with Beyoncé, “Slow Jamming The News” with President Obama, or mixing Justin Timberlake and The Roots in 5.1 surround sound to a live TV audience of millions.

Most recently, Lawrence recorded Danny Elfman's score for the highly anticipated film The Woman In The Window (Fox 2020) and served on the principal engineering team for Steven Spielberg's 2020 remake of West Side Story (Twentieth Century Fox). Lawrence also served as the Supervising Music Producer/Engineer/Mixer for Richard LaGravenese's film adaptation of Jason Robert Brown's musical ''The Last Five Years' (Radius-TWC) starring Anna Kendrick and Jeremy Jordan, of which Variety exclaimed “the film sounds fantastic”. He also recorded and mixed the Studio Cast Recording of Disney's The Hunchback of Notre Dame, co-produced the Grammy-nominated Original Cast Album for the Broadway smash Something Rotten!, and served as the Post Audio Mixer for Adele Live in New York City.

Other notable Broadway cast album recordings include A Bronx Tale, The Prom, Head Over Heels, The Cher Show, Summer: The Donna Summer Musical, Spider-Man: Turn Off The Dark, Pippin, and Kiss Me Kate. Other notable films include I, Tonya, The Girl On The Train, Godless, True Grit, Noelle, Frida, and Across The Universe. Numerous solo artist credits include albums with Sutton Foster, Kelli O’Hara, Jimmy Scott, Billy Porter, Matthew Morrison, David Sanborn, Dionne Warwick, Michel Legrand, and Bette Midler.

Lawrence is also the music mixer for NBC's The Tonight Show Starring Jimmy Fallon and co-producer of Fallon's Grammy-winning comedy album, Blow Your Pants Off. During his eleven years with Jimmy, he's mixed live performances by Billie Eilish, Ed Sheeran, Meghan Trainor, Prince, Lady Gaga, Beastie Boys, Bruce Springsteen, Paul McCartney, Sting, Metallica, Madonna, Ariana Grande, Green Day, Blake Shelton, Public Enemy, Dave Matthews Band, BTS, Shakira, U2, Foo Fighters, JLo, and The Who.

References

Year of birth missing (living people)
Living people
American audio engineers